Kunming University of Science and Technology (KUST) is in Kunming, the capital city of Yunnan Province, Southwestern China.

As the goal by 2010, KUST was to become a key university with a strong science and engineering background. The university is to be developed into an important provincial training base for advanced technical personnel, a research base for applied fundamental research and hi-tech research, an industrialization base for hi-tech, and a research and consulting center for the national social and economic development.

Yunnan University Science Park (YNUSP) was established as an experimental site of University Science Park in 1999 and was awarded the status of national university science park in May 2001. The park is supported by Yunnan University, Kunming University of Science & Technology, and Yunnan Normal University. As of 2022, the Best Chinese Universities Ranking ranked KUST 2nd best in Yunnan Province after Yunnan University and 139th nationwide

Brief Introduction 
Officially founded in 1954 and with the history started from 1925, Kunming University of Science and Technology (KUST) is one of the top 100 universities in China, and the largest university as well as the only polytechnic university across Yunnan province. Chinese Communist Party general secretary Xi Jinping praised KUST “a famous university in China” in early 2015 during an inspection tour of Yunnan province. KUST has 3 campuses, all located in Kunming, the capital of Southwest China’s Yunnan province.

With 30 faculties (schools/colleges) and 3,900 staff members, KUST is offering over 300-degree programs at Bachelor, Master, and Doctor levels to around 40,000 full-time on-campus students. The programs cover engineering, science, management, economics, medicine, law, arts, philosophy, agriculture, and education. In 2005, KUST was ranked by the Chinese Ministry of Education as the first Excellent University in Yunnan province for its excellent undergraduate programs. The disciplines of engineering, material science, and chemistry of KUST are ranked by ESI as the top 1% worldwide.

The research in KUST is at the top level in Yunnan province, in both funding and achievements, with the important feature of very close connections to industries. In certain fields, especially the subjects related to the mineral industry, KUST is at the top level of research in China. The annual research fund of KUST in the recent 10 years has been taking a proportion of over 60% of the total funding to all the universities in Yunnan province. KUST has 17 national level key-labs or research centers, and 91 of provincial/ministerial level and around 100 university level.

The goal of KUST is to develop into a high-level research university in the international region, to serve the sustainable development of the region, and serve the wellbeing of mankind, by offering excellent teaching, research, social services, and also by promoting culture inheritance and exchange. KUST has established partnerships with over 150 universities in more than 30 countries, for cooperation in research, student and staff exchange, joint programs, technical transfer, etc. As a representative institution of Chinese universities, KUST has been playing an important role for China in the cooperation with the neighboring Southeast Asia and South Asia countries, including in the mechanisms of Lancang-Mekong Cooperation (LMC), China-ASEAN Cooperation, GMS Cooperation, etc., and also in the other international and regional cooperation mechanisms including China-EU Cooperation, Asia-Europe higher education programs, among the others.

History 
Early in 1925, the beginning departments of KUST started admitting undergraduate students for bachelor degrees. In September 1954, KUST, formerly called KIT (Kunming Institute of Technology) became an independent public higher education institution. In 1999, the former KIT and former Yunnan Polytechnic University amalgamated into the current KUST.

Academics

Accreditation and memberships 
KUST is a member of SAP University Alliances.

Programs 
With the current 29 faculties (schools) covering the fields ranging from science, engineering and economics to administration, arts, law and education, KUST offers a complete list of degree programs including Ph.D., MS., MSEng., MEng, MA, BS, BSEng and BA, as well as programs including post-doctorate, preparatory, continuing education, vocational training and Chinese language training for international students.

Faculties 
Graduate School

Division of Life and Medical Sciences
Faculty of Life Science and Technology
       Center for Pharmaceutical Sciences and Engineering
       Center for Biotechnology and Bioengineering
Medical School
       Department of Clinical Medicine
       Department of Basic Medicine
Faculty of Agriculture and Food
Department of Agricultural Mechanization
Department of Agricultural Electrification
Department of Agricultural Hydraulic Engineering
Department of Food Science & Engineering
Department of Food Quality & Safety
Institute of Primate Translational Medicine

Faculty of Metallurgical and Energy Engineering
      Department of Metallurgical Engineering
      Department of New Energy Science and Engineering
      Department of Energy and Power Engineering

Faculty of Materials Science and Engineering
      Department of Materials Physics and Chemistry
      Department of Metallic Material Science
      Department of Inorganic & Non-metallic Material Science
      Department of Material Process Engineering
      Department of Gemmology and Materials Technology
      Materials Experiment and Testing Center

Faculty of Environmental Science and Engineering
      Department of Environmental Engineering
      Department of Environmental Science
      Department of Renewable Resource Science and Technology

Faculty of Land Resources Engineering
      Department of Geosciences
      Department of Land Information and Mapping Engineering
      Department of Resource Exploration Engineering
      Department of Mineral Process Engineering

Faculty of Mechanical and Electrical Engineering
      Department of Mechanical Engineering
      Department of Industrial Engineering
      Department of Packaging Engineering

Faculty of Information Engineering and Automation
      Department of Computer Science
      Department of Automation
      Department of Telecommunication Engineering
      Department of Biomedical Engineering

Faculty of Electric Power Engineering
      Department of Electrical Engineering
      Department of Hydraulic Engineering

Faculty of Civil Engineering and Mechanics
      Department of Civil Engineering
      Department of Engineering Mechanics
      Department of Municipal Engineering
      Department of Construction Management
      Institute of Building Environment and Energy Engineering

Faculty of Architecture and City Planning
      Department of Architecture
      Department of Urban and Rural Planning
      Department of Landscape Architecture

Faculty of Chemical Engineering
      Department of Chemical Engineering
      Department of Process Equipment and Control Engineering
      Department of Biomass Engineering

Faculty of Transportation Engineering
      Department of Traffic Engineering
      Department of Traffic and Transportation
      Department of Logistics Engineering
      Department of Vehicle Engineering

Faculty of Civil Aviation and Aeronautics

Faculty of Public Security and Emergency Management
      Department of Safety Engineering

Faculty of Management and Economics
      Department of Business Administration
      Department of Accounting
      Department of Applied Economics
      Department of Finance
      Department of Marketing
      Department of Management Science and Information System

Law School
     Center of Criminal Law
     Center of Constitution and Administrative Law
     Center of Environmental and Natural Resources Law
     Center of Civil and Commercial Law
     Center of Economic Law
     Center of Laws of Southeast Asia and International Law
     Center of Theories of Jurisprudence
     Yunnan Provincial Institute for Local Legislation
     Yunnan Provincial Institute of Intellectual Property Development

Faculty of Science
      Department of System Science and Applied Mathematics
      Department of Electronic Science and Applied Physics
      Department of Applied Chemistry
 
Faculty of Art and Communication
     Department of Environmental Design
     Department of Industrial Design
     Department of Journalism and Mass Communication
     Department of Visual Communication
     Department of Fine Arts

School of Marxism
     Teaching & Research Centre of Fundamental Principles of Marxism
     Teaching & Research Centre of Sinicized Marxism
     Teaching & Research Centre of Ideological and Political Education
     Teaching & Research Centre of Development of Modern Chinese Society
     Research Centre of Philosophy and Social Sciences
     Education Centre of Humanistic Quality

Faculty of Foreign Languages and Cultures
      Department of English Language and Literature
      Department of College English Teaching
      Department of English Teaching for Non-English Major Postgraduates
      MTI Education Center

City College
      Department of Architecture
      Department of Mechanical Engineering
      Department of Information Engineering
      Department of Civil Engineering
      Department of Art and Design
      Department of Accounting
      Department of Language Enhancement
      Department of Management and Economics
      Department of Earth Sciences
      Department of Public Foreign Language Teaching
      Department of Sports
      Department of General Core Courses
      Department of Communication Engineering
      Department of Traffic Engineering
      Department of Mechanical Engineering
      Department of Logistics Engineering

School of International Education
School of Continuing Education
Oxbridge College

Students 
KUST recruits students from all over China, including Hong Kong, Macao, and Taiwan. In addition, KUST is authorized to recruit international students for degree programs ranging from Bachelor to Master and Ph.D. There are about 28,000 students studying at KUST; among them, nearly 2,000 were graduate students (2004).

KUST offers 64 Bachelor programs, 49 Master programs, and eight Ph.D. program areas. There are three state-authorized post-doctoral stations, one state-level key academic subject, and 14 province-level key academic subjects.

Staff 
The staff numbers about 3,844 including academic and non-academic ones. Nearly 1,100 are professors and associate professors, and about 1,600 are full-time teaching staffs. There is one academician of China Academy of Engineering working for KUST and there are 17 academicians of China Academy of Science and of China Academy of Engineering jointly working for KUST.

Campuses and facilities 
KUST is composed of three campuses, Chenggong, Lianhua, and Xinying. All are in Kunming City, occupying an area of about 120 hectares. The buildings on the campuses occupy over 730,000 square meters, and many important construction projects are in progress.

The university library has about 1.7 million volumes of books and periodicals, and the library is authorized as a state-level research document collection unit. KUST has founded a state-level engineering research center, two provincial and/or ministerial level test stations, two research and development centers, two key laboratories of provincial level, and one class-A design and research institute. There are 32 research institutes, 13 research laboratories, and 13 research centers.

Rankings and Reputation 
In 2021, KUST ranked 701-800th globally by the Academic Ranking of World Universities (ARWU). The 2022 CWTS Leiden Ranking ranked KUST at 370th in the world based on their publications for the period 2017–2020. As of 2022, the Best Chinese Universities Ranking ranked KUST 2nd best in Yunnan Province after Yunnan University and 139th nationwide

Exchange and cooperation

Domestic
The university has ties with over 100 domestic local governments, institutions of higher education and research, as well as enterprises. The research activities in KUST play an important and critical role in Yunnan Province as well as in the southwest region of China. For the past two years, the increment of the research fund for KUST took a proportion of over two-thirds in the total increment for all the universities in Yunnan Province.

International
It has established cooperative and exchange relationships with nearly 70 universities in about 30 countries. One is Lamar University in Beaumont, Texas.

References

External links
http://www.kmust.edu.cn/

 
Universities and colleges in Kunming
1954 establishments in China
Technical universities and colleges in China